Loss E. Jones was a Michigan politician.

On November 2, 1846, Jones was elected to the Michigan House of Representatives where he represented the Jackson County district from January 4, 1847, to March 17, 1847. During his term in the legislature, he served on the Education committee. Jones lived in Brooklyn, Michigan.

References

Year of birth missing
Year of death missing
Members of the Michigan House of Representatives
People from Jackson County, Michigan
19th-century American politicians